Heela is a rare name derived from the Pashto language which translates to "to hope" or "to wish." 

PJ Harvey and John Parish released a song named Heela on their album Dance Hall at Louse Point.

Given names